Herenthout is a municipality located in the province of Antwerp in Belgium. The municipality only comprises the town of Herenthout proper, including Uilenberg. In 2021, Herenthout had a total population of 9,185 people. The total area is 23.55 km².

This village is also well known for having the officially recognized oldest organized carnival parade in Belgium, with the first edition dating back to February 1882. The mascot of the parade is named "Peer Stoet".

Notable people

 Jürgen Raeymaeckers (1985) – football striker who currently plays for K. Lyra T.S.V.
 Wim Vandekeybus (1963) – actor, choreographer, dancer and film director
 Johan Van Herck (1974) – former professional tennis player

Gallery

References

External links
 

Municipalities of Antwerp Province
Populated places in Antwerp Province